Number 42 Squadron was a squadron of the Royal Air Force. It served during the First World War as an army co-operation squadron and during the Second World War in various roles. Between 1992 and 2010, it was the Operational Conversion Unit (OCU) for the Hawker Siddeley Nimrod MR.2, based at RAF Kinloss, Moray, until the Nimrod MR.2's retirement in March 2010. No. 42 Squadron disbanded on 26 May 2011.

History

First World War
Formed on 1 April 1916 from crews of No. 19 Squadron Royal Flying Corps at RAF Filton, No. 42 Squadron spent the First World War flying reconnaissance sorties. Using Royal Aircraft Factory BE.2s (and later Royal Aircraft Factory R.E.8s), the squadron spent time on both the Western Front and the Austro-Italian Front. On returning to England after the war, the squadron was disbanded at RAF Netheravon on 26 June 1919.

The squadron was based at La Gorgue in northern France from 1 September to 8 November 1916.

Second World War
On 14 December 1936, 'B' flight of No. 22 Squadron was expanded into a new No. 42 Squadron. In 1939, No. 42 Squadron was based at RAF Bircham Newton. Initially the unit was equipped with Vickers Vildebeests before re-equipping with Bristol Beauforts in January 1940. The squadron operated also a bomber unit in the Burma campaign flying Blenheims during 1942 and as a fighter-bomber unit flying Hawker Hurricanes during 1943. The squadron disbanded on 30 June 1945 but on the following day No. 146 Squadron was renumbered to No. 42 Squadron and flew Republic Thunderbolts Mk.IIs. The squadron fought on with these until the Burma campaign ended and thereafter the squadron disbanded on 30 December 1945 at Meiktela.

Post-War

Beaufighters and Shackletons (1946–1971)
 
On 1 October 1946, No. 254 Squadron at RAF Thorney Island was renumbered to No. 42 Squadron. Equipped with Bristol Beaufighter, it was a strike unit in RAF Coastal Command until disbanded on 15 October 1947.

On 28 June 1952, No. 42 Squadron was reformed at RAF St. Eval, Cornwall, flying Avro Shackleton MR.1s in the maritime reconnaissance role. In 1954, the squadron began to re-equip with the Shackleton MR.2. On 11 January 1955, two squadron Shackleton MR.2s (WG531 and WL743) disappeared while operating near Fastnet Rock. No. 42 Squadron Shackletons used to regularly visit RAF Khormaksar in Aden before the Aden Emergency, with it undertaking colonial policing.

No. 42 Squadron relocated to RAF St. Mawgan in October 1958. In 1961, the squadron deployed to Jamaica to provide support for relief operations after Hurricane Hattie struck the Caribbean and British Honduras. It further converted to the Shackleton MR.3 in December 1965. In 1966, No. 42 Squadron deployed to Mahajanga, Malagasy Republic, to take part in the Beira Patrol which enforced the blockade of the port of Beira in Mozambique to prevent oil shipments to Rhodesia.

Nimrods (1971–2011)
 
In April 1971, No. 42 (Torpedo Bomber) Squadron began to convert to the Hawker Siddeley Nimrod MR.1. 

No. 42 (TB) Squadron were the first Nimrod unit to arrive at Wideawake Airfield, Ascension Island, when XV244 and XV258 landed on 6 April 1982 shortly after the invasion of the Falkland Islands. In October 1984, one of No. 42 (TB) Squadron's crews won the Fincastle Trophy at RAAF Base Edinburgh, South Australia. On 29 August 1985, Nimrod MR.2 XV229 helped locate the wreck of  Virgin Atlantic Challenger.

In June 1990, No. 42 (TB) Squadron won the Fincastle Trophy once again, this time at CFB Greenwood, Nova Scotia. In October 1990, the squadron deployed its crews to Seeb International Airport, Oman, and later to RAF Akrotiri, Cyprus, in January 1991 as part of Operation Granby. Nimrod MR.2 XV244 (Battle Star 42) was credited with 14 mission markings and four ship kills while deployed. One of the squadron's crews were credited with having achieved the highest number of assisted kills – six, achieved operating in a High Air Threat environment. The same crew subsequently received the Arthur Barratt Memorial Award.  

Disbanded as a front-line unit in October 1992, it was later reformed as No. 42 (Reserve) Squadron at RAF Kinloss, Moray, taking over from No. 236 OCU as the Nimrod Operational Conversion Unit (OCU). 

No. 42 (R) Squadron made the Nimrod's last visit to Gibraltar on 20/21 March 2010 as part of Operation Active Endeavour. The squadron flew its last Nimrod MR.2 flight on 30 March 2010 with XV232 visiting Rockall, St. Kilda, RAF St. Mawgan, RAF Valley and RAF Lossiemouth. It was originally expected that No. 42 (R) Squadron would serve as the OCU for the BAE Systems Nimrod MRA.4, however it was cancelled as part of the 2010 Strategic Defence and Security Review, with No. 42 (R) Squadron formally disbanding alongside the other Nimrod units on 26 May 2011.

Aircraft operated

See also
 List of accidents and incidents involving the Avro Shackleton

References

Notes

Bibliography

External links

The History of No 42 Squadron at raf.mod.uk
World War II bases of No. 42 Squadron
History of No.'s 41–45 Squadrons at RAF Web
Rickard, J. (1 October 2008), No. 42 Squadron (RAF): Second World War
No 42 Reserve Squadron, RAF

042 Squadron
042 Squadron
042 Squadron
Aircraft squadrons of the Royal Air Force in World War II
1916 establishments in the United Kingdom